Blatnice may refer to places in the Czech Republic:

Blatnice (Plzeň-North District), a municipality and village in the Plzeň Region
Blatnice (Třebíč District), a municipality and village in the Vysočina Region
Blatnice pod Svatým Antonínkem, a municipality and village in the South Moravian Region